The year 2016 was the eighth year in the history of BRACE, a mixed martial arts promotion based in Australia. In 2016 Brace held 8 events.

Events list

Brace 45 

Brace 45 was an event held on November 26, 2016, at AIS Arena in Canberra, Australia.

Results

Brace 44

Brace 44 was an event held on October 8, 2016, at RSL Southport in Gold Coast, Australia, Australia.

Results

Brace 43

Brace 43 was an event held on October 1, 2016, at Cowles Stadium
in Christchurch, New Zealand

Results

Brace 42

Brace 42 was an event held on August 13, 2016, at AIS Arena, in Canberra , Australia.

Results

Brace 41

Brace 41 was an event held on June 17, 2016, at Lincoln Events Centre, in Christchurch, New Zealand.

Results

Brace 40

Brace 40 was an event held on May 14, 2016, at RSL Southport, in Gold Coast, Australia , Australia.

Results

Brace 39

Brace 39 was an event held on April 16, 2016, at AIS Arena, in Canberra , Australia.

Results

Brace 38

Brace 38 was an event held on March 26, 2016, at Big Top Luna Park, in Sydney , Australia.

Results

References 

2016 in mixed martial arts
2016 in Australian sport
BRACE (mixed martial arts) events